= Sleigh songs of the 1850s =

Sleigh songs were a trend in popular song in the 1850s, as mentioned by Kyna Hammill., who claimed that "the song emerged from a practice that began on the northern minstrel stages of Boston and New York around 1853, in which a popular sleigh narrative that embeds a courting ritual became the target of burlesque." The Complete Catalogue of Sheet Music and Musical Works for 1870 lists 67 songs with “sleigh” in the title.
